The Cop in Blue Jeans is an Italian crime and comedy film directed by Bruno Corbucci. The film was a major commercial success and generated a film series consisting of eleven entries starring Tomas Milian as Inspector Nico Giraldi.

Plot 
An undercover cop named Giraldi is assigned to the anti-mugging squad. He tries to capture one of the main Rome thieves Achille Bertinari called Baron. But when the later robbed the American crime boss, Richard Russo, also known as Shelley, Giraldi understands that it is not an easy task to arrest Russo-Shelley, so he should resort to ruses to bring him down.

Cast 
Tomas Milian as Nico Giraldi
Jack Palance as Norman Shelley / Richard J. Russo
Maria Rosaria Omaggio as Mrs. Cattani
Guido Mannari as Achille Bertinari "Er Baronetto"
Jack La Cayenne as Colombo
Raf Luca as Gargiulo
Toni Ucci as Lando Rossi "Grottaferrata"
Vincenzo Crocitti as Er Zagaja
Benito Stefanelli as Shelley's Henchman
John P. Dulaney as Ballarin

Production
The Cop in Blue Jeans was the first film where Tomas Milian would portray Marshall Nico Giraldi, nicknamed Il Pirata. The character would go on to be portrayed in 11 films between 1976 and 1984. The producer Galliano Juso recalled that the idea for the character came when Bruno Corbucci and him were making a film titled Il trafficone. While filming, 
Juso had his purse stolen by thieves on Kawasaki motorcycles. This even led to Corbucci and him to develop a film about an "anti-snatch" squad.

The sequels to the film, Assassinio sul Tevere, Delitto a Porta Romana, Delitto al ristorante cinese, Delitto sull'autostrada, Crime in Formula One and Cop in Drag had little to do with the crime genre, and grew more comedic with each film.

Release
The Cop in Blue Jeans was distributed theatrically in Italy on 11 March 1976. It grossed a total of 2,013,807,160 Italian lire. Italian film historian and critic Roberto Curti stated that it was among the most profitable domestic productions of the year. The film was released on DVD by Raro Video in Italy.

Reception
From contemporary reviews, Scott Meek of the Monthly Film Bulletin reviewed a 75-minute edit of the film.  Meek stated that the film had a fractured plot which "maybe largely due to the twenty minutes missing from this version, but it is doubtful if, even in its complete form the story would have been at all coherent" stating the film "is aimed, to an almost fetishistic degree, at the lowest common denominator of the young, male, Italian audience." and that film was far too full of "sexism, anti-gay jokes and dubbed American dialogue, mostly consisting of unimaginative terms of abuse."

See also
 List of Italian films of 1976

References

Sources

External links

1976 films
Films directed by Bruno Corbucci
Italian comedy films
1970s crime comedy films
Films set in Rome
Films scored by Guido & Maurizio De Angelis
1976 comedy films
1970s Italian films